CoRoT-24c is a transiting exoplanet found by the CoRoT space telescope in 2011 and announced in 2014. Along with CoRoT-24b, it is one of two exoplanets orbiting CoRoT-24, making it the first multiple transiting system detected by the telescope. It is a hot Neptune orbiting at a distance of 0.098 AU from its host star.

References

Transiting exoplanets
Exoplanets discovered in 2011
24b